Frederick George Felsch (1915-1963) was an Australian rugby league footballer who played in the 1930s and 1940s.

Background
Felsch was born at Ulmarra, New South Wales and was of German descent,

Playing career
Felsch played nine seasons with South Sydney between 1936 and 1944. He rose to become club captain in the era prior to Jack Rayner.  Felsch played for the club in the 1939 NSWRL grand final against Balmain in which Souths lost heavily by a score of 33–4.  Felsch scored South Sydney's only points in the match kicking 2 goals.   

Felsch represented New South Wales on ten occasions between 1938 and 1941, although World War II curtailed any possibility of playing for Australia.

Death
Felsch died at North Sydney on 20 June 1963, aged 47.

References

1915 births
1963 deaths
Australian rugby league players
Australian people of German descent
New South Wales rugby league team players
City New South Wales rugby league team players
Country New South Wales rugby league team players
Rugby league centres
Rugby league fullbacks
Rugby league players from New South Wales
South Sydney Rabbitohs captains
South Sydney Rabbitohs players